Stony Stratford is a constituent town of Milton Keynes, Buckinghamshire, England. Historically it was a market town on the important route from London to Chester (Watling Street). It is also the name of a civil parish with a town council in the City of Milton Keynes. It is in the north-west corner of the Milton Keynes urban area, bordering Northamptonshire and separated from it  by the River Great Ouse.

History

Since at least Roman times, there has been a settlement here at the ford of Watling Street over the Great Ouse. The town's market charter dates from 1194 and its status as a town from 1215.

The town name is Anglo-Saxon in origin, and means "stony ford on a Roman road". The road in this instance is Watling Street, which runs through the middle of the town and crosses the River Ouse just outside it (nowadays by bridge). 

In 1789, at Windmill Field (probably) in the parish of Old Stratford near Stony Stratford, an urn was uncovered which contained three fibulae and two headdresses. Known as the Stony Stratford Hoard, it also contained around thirty fragments of silver plaques which were decorated with images of the Roman gods Mars, Apollo and Victory. There were also inscriptions to Jupiter and Vulcan leading to theories that this was a votive hoard associated with a Roman temple.  The hoard is now kept at the British Museum.

There has been a chartered market in Stony Stratford since 1194 (by charter of King Richard I). (Until the early 1900s, livestock marts were still held in the market square but in more recent times the square has become a car park, apart from a monthly farmers' market in one corner. The weekly market has moved to Timor Court, and of course no longer deals in livestock). Stony Stratford formally became a town when it received letters patent from King John in 1215.

Stony Stratford was the location where, in 1290, an Eleanor cross was built in memory of the recently deceased Queen Eleanor of Castile, as her funeral cortège had stopped overnight in the town en route to London. The cross was destroyed during the English Civil War.

The former Rose and Crown Inn at Stony Stratford was reputedly where, in 1483, the boy-king Edward V stayed the night before he was taken to London (to become one of the Princes in the Tower) by his uncle Richard, Duke of Gloucester, who soon became King Richard III. Edward had been returning from Ludlow Castle in the Welsh Marches to London to claim his crown on the death of his father, Edward IV, when he was met in Stony Stratford by his uncle, who later deposed him. The inn is now a private house but a plaque on the front wall commemorates the event.

Catherine of Aragon rode from London to address her troops assembling here for the Battle of Flodden, and went on to stay at Woburn Abbey in September 1513.

The town has twice become almost completely consumed by fire, the first time in 1736 and the second in 1742. The only building to escape the second fire was the tower of the chapel of ease of St Mary Magdalen, now a scheduled monument.

Since at least the 15th century, Stony Stratford was an important stop on the road to Ireland via Chester, becoming quite rich on the proceeds in the 16th century. In the stage coach era of the 17th and early 18th centuries, it was a major resting place and exchange point with the east–west route with coaching inns to accommodate coach travellers. Traffic on Watling Street and the consequent wear and tear to it was such as to necessitate  England's first turnpike trust, from Hockliffe to Stony Stratford, in 1707. In the early 19th century, over thirty mail coaches and stagecoaches a day stopped here. That traffic came to an abrupt end in 1838 when the London to Birmingham Railway (now the West Coast Main Line) was opened at Wolverton – ironically, just three years after the bridge over the Ouse had been rebuilt. Wolverton railway works provided an important source of employment in the town, with the Wolverton and Stony Stratford Tramway being built to serve the workers. With the arrival of the motor car, the town's position on the original A5 road made it again an important stopping point for travellers.

The 1841 census lists the population as 1,757.

Before the creation in 1974 of the (then) District of Milton Keynes (by the Local Government Act 1972), Stony was in Wolverton Urban District.

Cock and Bull Story

Due to the juxtaposition of two hotels in the centre of town, The Cock and The Bull (both originally coaching inns on the main London Chester turnpike), it is claimed locally that the common phrase a cock and bull story originated here.

Listed buildings 
The parish has one scheduled monument,  nine 'grade II*' listed buildings,
and a further 134 buildings and structures listed at Grade II.

The modern town
Today Stony Stratford is a busy market town. In early June, Stony Live is a week of cultural events that culminates in Folk on the Green, a free festival of folk music, folk rock and eclectic taste that takes over Horsefair Green.

Sport and leisure

Football 
Stony Stratford Town F.C. are a Non-League football club, founded in 1898 who play at Ostler's Lane.

Cricket 
Stony Stratford Cricket Club is an amateur cricket club, officially founded in the 1898, that is based at Ostlers Lane. The club has five senior XI teams that compete on Saturdays in the Northamptonshire Cricket League, two women senior XI teams in the Home Counties Women's Cricket League, a Sunday XI team in the Bedfordshire County Cricket League and an established junior training section that play competitive cricket in the Buckinghamshire CB Junior League.

Tennis 
Stony Stratford Lawn Tennis Club was founded in 1923 and is based at Ostler's Lane. The club have 9 courts of which 7 are floodlit and a new club house. Both Men and Women teams compete in the local Milton Keynes leagues, and Juniors also play in the Aegon Team Tennis League.

Bowls 
Stony Stratford Bowls Club was formed in 1923, and started playing on the present site at Ostler's Lane in 1924. The club compete in the Bletchley and District Bowls League and became league champions in 1994 and 2016.

Croquet 
Stony Stratford Croquet Club play on the Ancell Trust Sports Grounds at Ostler's Lane. The club won the East Anglian Croquet Federation's Handicap League in 2016.

In film
Scenes from the 1987 cult film Withnail and I were filmed in Stony Stratford. Cox and Robinsons chemist is the 'Penrith tea rooms' where Withnail demands "the finest wines known to humanity." The Crown pub became the 'King Henry pub' in the film. Both premises are on Market Square.

Civil parish

Historic parish
From about 1648, Stony Stratford was divided between the ecclesiastical parishes of Calverton and Wolverton, and covered by two chapelries: St Giles, attached to Calverton; and St Mary Magdalen, attached to Wolverton. St Mary Magdalen dates from about 1450, though only the tower remains from the 1742 fire. St Giles dates from the 15th century (as a chantry chapel), but all but the tower was rebuilt in 1776 to accommodate the parishioners of St Mary Magdalen.  

A single civil parish of "Stony Stratford" is recorded in 1767, which was divided in the "late 18th century" in Stony Stratford East and Stony Stratford West CPs. Both the civil parishes became part of Wolverton Urban District in 1919. These urban parishes were wound up in 1927 and both added to the parish of Wolverton.

Modern parish
The civil parish consists of the land north of H2 Millers Way to the south, the boundary with Calverton parish to the west, the Great Ouse (and Northamptonshire) to the north and west, and the A5 road to the east. The V4 Watling Street becomes Queen Eleanor Street here as it follows the original Stony Stratford bypass. Its districts are these:
 Stony Stratford itself (defined H1 Ridgeway (and reservation) to the southeast, the Calverton border to the southwest, then river around west to north, and Queen Eleanor Street to the east and southeast)
 Galley Hill (H1 to the southeast, V4 to the southwest and the A5 around to the north-east).
 Fullers Slade (H2 to the southeast, H1 to the northwest, V4 Watling Street to the sothwest and the A5 to the northeast).

The modern civil parish was established in 2001.

Transport

Road
The town is no longer on any national routes. Watling Street, a Roman road, runs through the town (where it is called "London Road", "High Street" and "Towcester Road"): this was route of the A5 until it was rerouted (twice) onto new alignments in the latter half of the 20th century. Local roads link the town directly to Fenny Stratford, Wolverton and Winslow.

Rail

From 1887 to 1926, the Wolverton and Stony Stratford Tramway linked Stony Stratford with Wolverton and (briefly) Deanshanger.

Bus
Bus 6 (Arriva) connects the town with Wolverton, Central Milton Keynes, Bletchley and the Lakes Estate (running roughly every 30 mins from Monday to Friday), whilst Bus X60 (also operated by Arriva) connects the town with Aylesbury, Central Milton Keynes and Crownhill.

Images of Stony Stratford

See also 
 Wolverton and Stony Stratford Tramway
 The Stony Stratford Hoard (actually found in Old Stratford parish).

References

External links

 A tour of Stony Stratford, comparing early and modern photographs, at the Milton Keynes Heritage Association web site.
 Panoramic images and large selection of photographs of the town and its locality.
 Stony Stratford Methodist Church
 'Parishes : Stony Stratford', A History of the County of Buckingham: Volume 4 (1927), pp. 476–482.
 Aerial photographs & video of Stony Stratford and the surrounding area.
 Aerial panoramas of the landscape surrounding Stony Stratford.
 Stony Stratford redevelopment, part of Milton Keynes - A Village Life on BFI Player.

Towns in Buckinghamshire
Market towns in Buckinghamshire
Populated places on the River Great Ouse
Milton Keynes
Civil parishes in Buckinghamshire